The Twelve Chairs is a 1970 American comedy film directed and written by Mel Brooks and starring Frank Langella, Ron Moody, and Dom DeLuise. The film was one of at least 18 film adaptations of the Russian 1928 novel The Twelve Chairs by Ilf and Petrov.

Plot
In the Soviet Union in 1927, Ippolit Matveyevich Vorobyaninov, an impoverished aristocrat from Imperial Russia now working as a local village bureaucrat, is summoned to the deathbed of his mother-in-law. She reveals before dying that a fortune in jewels had been hidden from the Bolsheviks by being sewn into the seat cushion of one of the twelve chairs from the family's dining room set. After hearing the dying woman's confession, the Russian Orthodox priest Father Fyodor, who had arrived to  administer the last rites, decides to abandon the Church and attempt to steal the treasure for himself. Shortly afterwards in the town of Stargorod, where Vorobyaninov's former mansion is located, a homeless con-artist, Ostap Bender, meets the dispossessed nobleman and manipulates his way into a partnership in his search for the family riches.

The chairs, along with all other private property, had been appropriated by the State after the Russian Revolution. Vorobyaninov and Bender set off together to locate the chairs and recover the fortune, but are stymied by a series of false leads and other trying events. They find that the chairs have been split up and sold individually. Therefore, their hunt requires a great deal of travel to track down and open up each piece of the set in order to eliminate it as a possible location of the booty. As they progress, they meet comrades from every walk of life in Soviet Russian society, transforming the film into a satirical send up of failing Communism.

By posing as the official in charge of the Department of Chairs, Bender tricks Father Fyodor into a wild goose chase to recover a similar set of eleven chairs in the possession of an engineer in a remote province in Siberia. Father Fyodor makes the long journey only to be thrown out of the engineer's house. When the engineer is reassigned to a post on the Black Sea, Fyodor follows him and buys the counterfeit chairs (on the condition that the engineer and his wife never see him again). He finds that none of the chairs has the jewels. Later, he runs across Vorobyaninov and Bender after they have retrieved one chair from a circus, and while being chased by them frantically climbs with the chair straight up the side of a mountain.  After finding out that this chair doesn't contain the jewels, he finds that he is unable to get down again without help. Vorobyaninov and Bender leave him to his fate.

After traveling many miles and perpetrating numerous cons to pay for the lengthy enterprise, the two men return to Moscow where they discover the last chair; because the others contained no hidden treasure, this one must contain it all. It is located in a Palace of Culture, which is inconvenient due to the presence of so many witnesses. Vorobyaninov and Bender return after closing time, entering through a window Bender secretly had unlocked earlier.

At the moment of discovery, Bender carefully and quietly opens the chair cushion with his knife, but their hopes are dashed as it is found to be completely empty. Vorobyaninov is stunned and angry, but Bender laughs at the absurdity of the situation. A watchman finds them, and Vorobyaninov demands to know what happened to the jewels. "Look around you," the watchman answers, explaining that after the jewels were accidentally found, they were used to finance construction of the grand building in which they stand. Driven into a sudden rage, Vorobyaninov smashes the chair to pieces and assaults the officer whom the watchman has summoned. After admonishing him for hitting a policeman, Bender leads the way and they escape into the night.

At the end of his patience, demoralized and bankrupted, Bender proposes that he and Vorobyaninov go their separate ways. In a desperate attempt to keep Bender from leaving, Vorobyaninov flings the remains of the last chair into the air, and collapses to the ground feigning an epileptic seizure; this is an act they had previously rehearsed as part of a con. Attracted by the crowd and understanding what Vorobyaninov is doing, Bender calls for the crowd's attention and begs the passers-by to give generously to this sad and stricken man. Using simple gestures without uttering a word, the two men cement their partnership in crime.

Cast
 Ron Moody as Ippolit Matveyevich Vorobyaninov
 Frank Langella as Ostap Bender
 Dom DeLuise as Father Fyodor
 Andreas Voutsinas as Nikolai Sestrin
 Diana Coupland as Madame Bruns
 David Lander as Engineer Bruns
 Vlada Petric as Sevitsky
 Elaine Garreau as Claudia Ivanovna
 Robert Bernal as Curator
 Will Stampe as Night watchman
 Mel Brooks as Tikon

Production
Principal photography for the film took place in Yugoslavia, primarily the Belgrade region from late August to mid November 1969.

Release

Reception
The Twelve Chairs received generally positive reviews from critics. On Rotten Tomatoes, it has a 93% approval score based on 14 reviews, with an average rating of 6.7/10.

Vincent Canby of The New York Times wrote, "For some reason, this sort of comedy of physical insult seemed much funnier to me in the Broadway world of The Producers, which is really aggressive and nasty and cheap, than in a Russia that is not too far removed from the world of Sholem Aleichem." Roger Ebert of the Chicago Sun-Times gave the film four stars out of four and wrote that while "you do laugh a lot ... It's not going for the laughs alone. It has something to say about honor among thieves, and by the end of the film we can sense a bond between the two main characters that is even, amazingly, human." Gene Siskel of the Chicago Tribune also gave the film four stars out of four, finding that it was not only funny but remarkable for "the quality of [Brooks's] direction, not even considering that The Twelve Chairs is only his second film. Brooks is in complete control of the many film techniques—visual and dramatic—he employs: slow motion, speed-ups and sight gags clearly borrowed from the silent era." Charles Champlin of the Los Angeles Times wrote that "despite some nicely farcical and stylized moments—many of them provided by Brooks himself in a cameo role as a drunken servant—the movie's first half isn't strong enough to override a thin and disappointing second half." Gary Arnold of The Washington Post found the film "much more consistent and fluid than Brooks' first film, The Producers. You don't gyrate as wildly between inspired and mediocre bits, but the 'wild' bits, the idees fixes,are still there, performed brilliantly by Moody and DeLuise and Brooks himself." Richard Combs of The Monthly Film Bulletin wrote that Dom DeLuise "simpers and slavers to great effect as the piously greedy Father Fyodor ... DeLuise, in fact, considerably outshines the two leads."

John Simon said The Twelve Chairs "is a model of how not to make a comedy."

Box office
The film opened at the Tower East in New York and the Beverly Cinema in Los Angeles, grossing $40,000 in its first week.

Awards
Langella won the National Board of Review award for Best Supporting Actor. Brooks was nominated by the Writers Guild of America for Best Comedy Adapted from Another Medium.

References

External links
 
 
 
 

1970 films
1970 comedy films
American comedy films
Films scored by John Morris
Films based on Russian novels
Films directed by Mel Brooks
Films set in 1927
Films set in Russia
Ilf and Petrov
Films with screenplays by Mel Brooks
Films shot in Yugoslavia
1970s English-language films
1970s American films